Stan Smith was the defending champion and won in the final 6–4, 6–0, 6–2 against Wojciech Fibak.

Seeds
The draw allocated unseeded players at random; as a result five seeds received byes into the second round.

  Eddie Dibbs (third round)
  Gene Mayer (semifinals)
  Wojciech Fibak (final)
  Brian Gottfried (second round)
  Stan Smith (champion)
  Eliot Teltscher (second round)
  Johan Kriek (third round)
  Corrado Barazzutti (quarterfinals)
  Ivan Lendl (semifinals)
  Vince Van Patten (second round)
  Raúl Ramírez (third round)
  Balázs Taróczy (second round)
  Tom Okker (second round)
  Heinz Günthardt (third round)
  Pavel Složil (second round)
  Željko Franulović (quarterfinals)

Draw

Finals

Top half

Section 1

Section 2

Bottom half

Section 3

Section 4

References
 1979 Fischer-Grand Prix Draw

1979 Fischer-Grand Prix